The KLIN Group is a Scottish property development, regeneration and investment company founded in 1988 by John Dick. The company today is a second generational family business, with Dick's daughter, Marie Macklin CBE, having been CEO of the company from 2003 until 2014, at which point she sold the company to Drew Macklin. Drew Macklin currently serves as a director of the company, having been appointed to the role on June 1, 2011.

The KLIN Group has invested heavily in the regeneration of Kilmarnock town centre, including renovation and restoration work on the derelict Opera House building in John Finnie Street, having re-constructed the interior of the building following fire damage.

History
The KLIN Group was founded in Kilmarnock in 1988 by construction veteran, John Dick. During the 2000s, his daughter Marie Macklin took over the running and operations of the business as chief executive officer, which saw the company focus more on property development and regeneration work within Kilmarnock and East Ayrshire. In 2003, the KLIN Group was responsible for introducing Morrisons to a 12 acre site in Kilmarnock where they created Scotland's first Morrisons superstore. The £60 million investment package included the restoration of the former Andrew Barclay Sons & Co. headquarters adjacent to the new superstore, as well as for the derelict Opera House building on John Finnie Street.

The KLIN Group was one of the first private sector investors in the regeneration of the Tollcross area of Glasgow. The company completed several brownfield housing developments in the area which led the way for further third party investment.

KLIN Holdings Ltd.
The KLIN Group now operates as KLIN Holdings Ltd., with Drew Macklin serving as a company director since 2011. KLIN Holdings was originally incorporated into The KLIN Group in 1999.

Barclay House 

The KLIN Group had undertaken extensive repair work and restoration of Barclay House, the former offices and HQ of Kilmarnock locomotive builders Andrew Barclay Sons & Co. The company developed the main office building into the HQ of the KLIN Group, as well as providing office space for other additional businesses. The connecting part to the original red-bricked building had been developed into accommodation, with several apartments available for rent and lease available.

Services

Projects and developments

The KLIN Group has been responsible for the regeneration and construction of various large scale projects including:

 Morrison Supermarket Kilmarnock
 Opera House (now East Ayrshire Council offices)
 Barclay House (KLIN Group headquarters)
 Tollcross
 Glebe Court
 Paisley Road
 Nursery Gardens
 Townhead Gardens
 Ludovic Court

Subsidiaries
The KLIN Group owns and controls various subsidiaries from the main KLIN Group company including:

 KLIN Homes - House Builders
 KLINCribs - Property Letting
 KLIN Holdings - Investments and land
 KLIN Developments - Mixed use developments
 KLIN Contracts - Construction
 KLIN Retail - Retail developments

See also
 The HALO Urban Regeneration 
 Kilmarnock

External links
 KLIN Group on Twitter

References 

1988 establishments in Scotland
Kilmarnock
Property companies of Scotland
Real estate companies established in 1988
British companies established in 1988